Kathryn Hall may refer to:

 Kathryn T. Hall, African-American professor of medicine, geneticist and molecular biologist 
 Kathryn Walt Hall, American attorney, businesswoman and former diplomat

See also
 Catherine Hall (disambiguation)
 Kathy Hall